Pontioi Verias Football Club is a football club based in Rahia, Imathia, Greece. Pontioi Verias FC was founded in 1984. Last season Pontioi Verias remained at A2 EPS Imathias league as they finished 7th.

History
Pontioi's best campaign happened during 1992–93 season in Beta Ethniki where they finished at 10th position. They were earlier promoted from Gamma Ethniki, during 1991–92 season as champions in Gamma Ethniki. That position is their best till today. The following season (1993–94) Pontioi finished at 12th position and in season 1994–95 they got relegated to Gamma Ethniki and they'd never return to professional level till today.

Notable players
 Pantelis Kafes
 Andreas Niniadis
 Ilias Atmatzidis
 Nikos Dabizas

Honours

Domestic Titles and honours
 Football League II: 1
 1991–92

Football clubs in Central Macedonia
Sport in Veria